Staicu is a Romanian surname. Notable people with this surname include:

 Dragoș Staicu (born 1985), Romanian alpine skier
 Ion Staicu (born 1927), Romanian bobsledder
 Marius Staicu (born 1987), Romanian footballer
 Mădălin Staicu (born 1990), Romanian footballer
 Simona Staicu (born 1971), Romanian runner

Other
 Staicu river, tributary of the Jiul de Est, Romania

Romanian-language surnames